Rabeya is a variation of the Arabic given name, Rābiʿah (رابعة), meaning "spring" or "fourth female". It may refer to:

People 
 Rabeya Alim, Bangladesh Awami League politician
 Rabeya Chowdhury, Bangladesh Nationalist Party politician
 Rabeya Khan, Bangladeshi cricketer
 Rabeya Khatun, Bangladeshi novelist
 Rabia Bhuiyan, Jatiya Party (Ershad) politician

Other uses 
 Rabeya (2008 film), Bangladeshi film

See also 
 Rabia (disambiguation)